NA-159 Vehari-IV is a constituency for the National Assembly of Pakistan.

Election 2002 

General elections were held on 10 Oct 2002. Azhar Ahmad Khan Yousaf Zai of PPP won by 73,014 votes.

Election 2008 

General elections were held on 18 Feb 2008. Mahmood Hayat Khan Tochi Khan of PPP won by 87,124 votes.

Election 2013 

General elections were held on 11 May 2013. Saeed Ahmed Khan Manais of PML-N won by 83,895 votes and became the  member of National Assembly.

Election 2018 

General elections are scheduled to be held on 25 July 2018.

By-election 2023 
A by-election will be held on 19 March 2023 due to the resignation of Aurangzeb Khan Khichi, the previous MNA from this seat.

See also
NA-158 Vehari-III
NA-160 Bahawalnagar-I

References

External links 
Election result's official website

NA-170